The Samruddhi Mahamarg or Nagpur-Mumbai Expressway  (officially known as Hindu Hrudaysamrat Balasaheb Thackeray Maharashtra Samruddhi Mahamarg) and Maharashtra Expressway-2 (ME-2), is a partially opened 6-lane wide (expandable to 8), 701-km long access-controlled expressway in Maharashtra, India. It is amongst the country's longest greenfield road projects, which will connect the two capital cities of the state, its capital, Mumbai, and its third-largest and vice-capital city, Nagpur. The project is being led by the state infrastructure arm Maharashtra State Road Development Corporation (MSRDC), and is designed under the Engineering, Procurement and Construction (EPC) model.

With the route alignment connecting Shivmadka village in Nagpur district to Amane village in Thane district, the expressway is capable of providing an enhanced connectivity to the Marathwada and Vidarbha regions. The Government of Maharashtra believes that the expressway will become a prosperity corridor for the overall socio-economic growth of the state.

Route alignment 
The Mumbai–Nagpur Expressway will travel through 10 key districts directly and 14 districts indirectly via feeder roads, 24 talukas, and 392 villages. The 10 main districts are Nagpur, Wardha, Amravati, Washim, Buldhana, Jalna, Aurangabad, Nashik, Ahmednagar and Thane. The other 14 districts include Chandrapur, Bhandara, Gondia, Gadchiroli, Yavatmal, Akola, Hingoli, Parbhani, Nanded, Beed, Dhule, Jalgaon, Palghar and Raigad.
Yavatmal City is going to Connect with Four Lane road to Samruddhi Expressway and Amravati too.Four Lane Road will be construct between Yavatmal City to Badnera.

Cities and towns
Below are the lists of cities/towns through which the Mumbai–Nagpur Expressway will connect:
 Center of Bhiwandi
 North of Kalyan
 South of Shahapur
 South of Igatpuri (Nashik)
 South of Sinnar
 South of Kopargaon
 North of Shirdi
 South of Vaijapur
 North of Aurangabad Caves
 North of Shendra
 North of Jalna
 North of Sindkhed Raja
 North of Mehkar
 North of Malegaon Jahangir   
 North of Karanja Lad
 South of Dhamangaon
 North of Pulgaon
 North of Wardha
 South of Seloo
 West of Butibori Power Plant
 South of MIHAN SEZ (Nagpur)

Enhanced connectivity 
To create a fast logistics gateway for national and international trade, the expressway will connect the country's largest container port JNPT in Mumbai to Mihan in Nagpur. The expressway will allow access to several industrial & economic corridors through 24 interchanges at strategic locations. It will widely connect the Delhi-Mumbai Industrial Corridor, Bengaluru-Chennai Economic Corridor, Western Dedicated Freight Corridor, Eastern Dedicated Freight Corridor, Chennai-Vizag Economic Corridor and Golden Quadrilateral. Apart from JNPT other seaports including Kandla MBPT, Mormugao, New Mangalore, Kochi, Chennai, Visakhapatnam and Ennore will also have indirect connectivity.

Characteristics and design

Characteristics

 The project led by MSRDC will observe international road design & safety standards with an intelligent highway management system for traffic surveillance.
 The expressway is designed for a top speed of 150 km/hr at plain terrain and 120 km/hr at hilly terrain even though the legal speed limit remains at 120 km/hr for cars and 80 km/hr for trucks enforceable by CCTV cameras, making it the fastest road network in the country which will cut down the travel time between the two cities to eight hours from the present 16-hour.
 The Super Communication Expressway will considerably contribute 6% to the national trunk and freight infrastructure.
 Nearly 36% of the state population will observe the Samruddhi Corridor as a substantial growth driver putting a direct positive impact on their livelihood.
 The MSRDC has been authorized as a nodal agency – New Town Development Authority (NTDA) for developing 19 new townships along the route which will include state-of-the-art healthcare facilities, skill development centers, IT parks and educational institutions.
 The expressway will pass through 3 wildlife sanctuaries including a 29.6 km passage through Katepurna Wildlife Sanctuary in Akola, 29.15 km through Karanja-Sohol Black Buck Sanctuary in Washim and 44.975 km through the Tansa Wildlife Sanctuary in Thane.
 The Mumbai–Nagpur Expressway has been envisioned to ensure zero fatalities and will have CCTVs and free telephone booths at every 5 km intervals in case of emergency situation.
 Truck terminals in close proximity to industrial clusters, machinery & manufacturing units, agro-processing zones, and integrated cold-chain storage facilities will be planned to build export-ready and quick logistics infrastructure.  
 The HHBTMSM Expressway will have a separate provision for the optical fiber connectivity and gas pipelines turning the greenfield expressway into a 'digital ready' utility corridor.

Design

 A single layer concrete paver has been utilized for the whole 15 meter width of the concrete slabs on either side of the road.  
The expressway will be designed to aid as a runway for airplanes to facilitate fast incident response in war-like situations, emergencies or natural disasters.
 An Integrated Traffic Management System will be deployed along the expressway to keep tabs on vehicles speeding, lane discipline or vehicular breakdowns.
 At every 40–50 km of interval on the e-way, wayside amenities like food plazas and rest areas along with electric charging stations for electric vehicles will be made available.
 Extensive landscaping, tunnel lighting, bridge beautification, improved street lighting and digital signage will be used throughout the length of the expressway.
 Amongst the 32 major bridges that shall be built along the expressway, 5 bridges at Nagpur, Wardha, Nashik, Buldhana, and Thane are proposed to have a theme-based iconic design.
To ensure digital readiness and resource availability, provisions will be laid down for optical fiber connectivity, natural gas pipelines, and electricity grid along the Mahamarg at industrial townships.
With electric vehicle charging points proposed at prospecting locations along the expressway and solar plants planned to generate 250MW energy, the Samruddhi Corridor aims to become a model of an energy efficient corridor.
Maximum locally available material, fly ash and plastic will be used to construct the expressway wherever possible. Rain water will also be harvested at prospect locations along the expressway to ensure water availability.
The expressway will connect several tourism circuits offering eco, pilgrim, and heritage tourism which will include wildlife resorts, tiger safaris, museums, sightseeing destinations, and theme-based retail outlets.
The expressway is a 6 lane (with paved and unpaved shoulders on both sides) access-controlled super communication expressway comprising a total width of 120 m (90 m in hilly terrain) with a central median of 22.5 m.
The expressway will be the country's largest 'Greenfield' route alignment including 65 flyovers/viaducts, 24 interchanges, 6 tunnels, 400+ vehicular, 300+ pedestrian underpasses, and cattle underpasses at strategic locations.

Construction
To expedite the pre-construction work on the expressway, MSRDC decided to divide the design work into 5 packages and hired a separate consultancy firm to prepare the Detailed Project Report (DPR) for each package. On 31 May 2017, the Government of Maharashtra incorporated 'Nagpur Mumbai Super Communication Expressway Limited', a special purpose vehicle (SPV) to manage the financial requirement for the construction and operation of this project.

The construction work of 701 km long Mumbai–Nagpur Expressway is divided into 16 packages, with work awarded to 13 different contractors including Afcons Infrastructure, Larsen & Toubro (L&T) and Reliance Infrastructure.

As of 31 May 2021, out of the total 1699 structures including flyovers, viaducts, major & minor bridges, tunnels, interchanges, etc., construction of 1286 structures has already been completed and the construction of 253 structures are inching towards completion. Total 6 tunnels will be built along the expressway and the construction for all of the tunnels is underway in full swing.

New township development 
The Government of Maharashtra has authorized MSRDC to act as the New Town Development Authority to venture into the long-term development of 19 new towns  at strategic nodes, which is also coined as 'Krushi Samruddhi Nagar.' The provisions are enacted under sub-sec (1) and section 113 of the MR & TP Act, 1966. The developmental objective to propose these new towns is to encourage the self-employment potential of the regional population through their primitive occupation i.e., agriculture or agro-related businesses.

Every township developed under the initiative of Krushi Samruddhi Nagar will be built in a land area of approximately 1000-1500 hectares. The new towns shall serve as the utility economic nodes for food processing industry, integrated logistics, and domestic food markets along with education centers, skill development institutes, healthcare facilities, and commercial & residential housings. The new townships will offer huge industrial land-banks with a focus on dedicated export-oriented infrastructure and integrated logistics to ease supply chain with enhanced road connectivity for domestic markets.

The 19 new towns will be developed at strategic intersections at a distance of 30 to 40 km from each other. These towns will be developed in two phases; phase one includes seven townships while the remaining eleven townships will be developed in phase two. The new towns will encompass essential facilities including schools, Industrial Training Institutes (ITIs), skill development centers, institutes providing technical education & amp, higher education, hospitals, police stations, playgrounds, open spaces, parks and sports complexes. The new townships will be easily accessible from main roads, feeder roads, national or state highways intersecting the Samruddhi Expressway through the public transport system. The MSRDC adopted land pooling model for land acquisition, wherein 30 percent of the total land acquired under 'Krushi Samruddhi Kendra' program will be returned to landowners. The farmers will also receive compensation of Rs 50,000 per hectare for non-irrigated land and Rs 1 lakh every year for irrigated land for the next 10 years. Based on the suggestions from Wildlife Institute of India (WII), wildlife mitigation measures are planned and necessary structures like cattle underpasses are being built for uninterrupted wildlife movement. Around 320 private communicators were trained and deployed by MSRDC for land acquisition negotiations with prospecting landowners.

Inter-connectivity

Following will either connect or act as an alternative to the Mumbai–Nagpur Expressway:

 Nagpur–Vijayawada Expressway is part of Nagpur-Vijayawada Economic Corridor which will connect Nagpur-Chandrapur (part greenfield) to Mancherial-Warangal (greenfield), Warangal-Khammam (greenfield), Khammam-Vijayawada (part greenfield). The tenders were issued in November 2022, would be likely completed by the late 2024 or mid 2025.

 Raipur–Visakhapatnam Expressway will be an alternative to the Nagpur-Vijayawada Expressway for the access to various ports across the Western Ghats in Bay of Bengal.
 Jalna-Nanded Expressway at will aso provide direct connectivity between Vijayawada-Hyderabad Expressway (at Hydrabad) and Mumbai–Nagpur Expressway (at Jalna).
 Hyderabad–Indore Expressway at Akola via Nanded-Akola-Omkareshwar-Indore, which will further connect to Delhi-Mumbai Expressway via Kota–Indore Expressway (136 km).

Status updates

 May 2016: Five design consultants appointed for making Detailed Project Report (DPR).
 Jan 2017: Request for Qualification (RfQ) bids opened for civil works.
 May 2017: A public company named Nagpur Mumbai Super Communication Expressway Limited, was formed on 31 May 2017.
 Jul 2017: Land acquisition process started.
 May 2018: MSRDC opened financial bids submitted by qualified contractors.
 May 2018: Government of Maharashtra gave its official approval for Concession Agreement for the project.
 Jun 2018: Lowest bidders identified for 13 packages out of total 16. Bidding for remaining 3 packages to happen soon.
 Nov 2018: Land acquisition in progress. Work to be done in 16 packages, contractors for which are already identified. Work to start in December.
 Jan 2019: Contract awarded for all 16 packages by MSRDC to 13 contractors. Road construction started.
 Sep 2019: The expressway will be ready by the year 2022, says the Minister of Public Works of Maharashtra, Eknath Shinde.
 Nov 2019:As of now, the expressway is 22% completed.
 Mar 2020: 86% of land acquisition is completed, with the expressway's paving also being underway.
 Jul 2020: 45% work completed. The 623 km stretch between Nagpur to Igatpuri is expected to be ready and opened by December 2021, while the 78 km stretch between Igatpuri to Amane is expected to be completed by May 2022.
 Oct 2020: The 520-km stretch from Nagpur to Shirdi is expected to become operational by May 2021, while the 623-km stretch from Nagpur to Igatpuri is expected is expected become operational by December 2021. The full expressway will become operational by May 2022.
 May 2021: The opening of 520 km long stretch from Nagpur to Shirdi is delayed. It is expected to become operational by September 2021.
 Jul 2021: 60% construction work of the 7.78 km long Igatpuri tunnel is completed as on 10 July. Once ready, it will be Maharashtra's longest road tunnel, and India's widest road tunnel.
Aug 2021: Work on 7.78 km long Igatpuri tunnel to be completed by September-end.
Sep 2021: The 7.78 km long Igatpuri tunnel is completed, and work is currently going on for the expressway's pavement and installation of lights. It is expected to be fully completed by December.
Mar 2022: The Nagpur to Shirdi stretch of the expressway is expected to be opened by early May 2022.
April 2022: From Shivmadka to Shelu Bazar (Washim district), the 210 km stretch of the expressway is expected to be opened by 2 May 2022.
April 2022: The opening of the expressway has been delayed, due to damaging of the wildlife overpass near Nagpur.
April 2022: Both Phase-1 and Phase-2 of the expressway are set to open by August.
July 2022: The first leg of 520 km stretch from Nagpur and Shirdi is confirmed to be inaugurated on 15 August 2022. The remainder of the expressway from Shirdi to Mumbai was initially expected to be completed by the start of 2023, but this did not happen due to a delay. A new tentative date is 24 October 2023.
December 2022: The first phase of the expressway from Nagpur to Shirdi was inaugurated and opened by Prime Minister Narendra Modi on 11 December, while the second phase from Shirdi to Mumbai will be opened in June 2023.
January 2023: The second phase until Mumbai will be opened in December 2023.

See also 
Mumbai-Pune Expressway
Delhi-Mumbai Expressway
Jalna-Nanded Expressway
Expressways in India
NHAI

References

External links 
 Project Website

Expressways in Maharashtra
Transport in Mumbai
Transport in Nagpur
Proposed infrastructure in Maharashtra